Rob Johnston is the assistant general secretary of the International Transport Workers’ Federation - a global union federation of trade unions in the seafaring, port, road, rail, tourism and aviation industries.

Career 
He was formerly a Research and Policy Officer for Amicus the Union, now Unite, in the UK. At Amicus, Johnston focused on the aerospace sector, helping secure funding for major aerospace projects and acting as an expert on UK Government's Department of Trade & Industry Aerospace Innovation and Growth team.

Between 2004 and 2009, Rob served as Director - Steel, Shipbuilding and Occupational Health & Safety and International Metalworkers Federation, which is now IndustriALL, in Geneva. He then served as an Executive Director at IndustriALL between 2009 and 2012, before becoming the global union's Executive Director - Industrial and TNC Policies, based in Sydney, serving in that role until 2013.

Johnston returned to the UK in 2013 to work as Community's Industrial Strategy Director, which he did until 2016. Johnston joined the ITF in 2016 as the Assistant General Secretary.

As an International industrial relations expert, he negotiated the ArcelorMittal Global Agreement on Health and Safety on which he also acted as the Co-Chair. He also served as the TUAC Chair on the Steel and Shipbuilding Committee of the Organisation for Economic Co-operation and Development (OECD) 2005–2012.

Articles

External links 
 International Transport Workers' Federation
 ITF Seafarers Website
 ITF Dockers and Seafarers Website
 Seafarers Trust Website



Living people
International Transport Workers' Federation
English trade unionists
British trade union leaders
Year of birth missing (living people)